Friedrich Wilhelm Schneidewin (6 June 1810 – 11 January 1856), was a German classical scholar.

Biography
He was born on 6 June 1810 at Helmstedt. In 1833, he became a teacher at the Braunschweig gymnasium. In 1837 he was appointed an associate professor, and in 1842, a full professor of classical languages and literature at the University of Göttingen where he died on 11 January 1856.

Works
Schneidewin's work on Sophocles and the Greek lyric poets is of permanent value. His most important publications are:
 Ibyci Rhegini carminum reliquiae (1833), severely criticized by G. Hermann.
 Simonidis Cei carminum reliquiae (1835); edition of Simonides of Ceos.
 Delectus poesis Graecorum elegiacae, iambicae, melicae (1838-39), in which the fragments of the lyric poets were for the first time published in a convenient form.
 Corpus Paroemiographorum Graecorum: Zenobius, Diogenianus, Plutarchus and Gregorius Cyprius, 1839–51, with E. von Leutsch), Gottingae, apud Vandenhoeck et Ruprecht, vol. 1, vol. 2.
 Sophocles (1849-1854, revised after his death by A. Nauck).

He also edited the fragments of the speeches of Hypereides on behalf of Euxenippus and Lycophron (already published by Churchill Babington from a papyrus discovered in Thebes, Egypt, in 1847) and a Latin poem on rhetorical figures by an unknown author (Incerti auctoris de figuris vel schematibus versus heroici, 1841), found by Jules Quicherat in manuscript in the Paris library. Schneidewin was also the founder of Philologus (1846), a journal devoted to classical learning, and dedicated to the memory of K. O. Müller.

Notes

References
 
Attribution:
  This work in turn cites:
  
 E. von Leutsch in Philologus, x.
 M. Lechner, Zur Erinnerung an K. F. Hermann, F. W. Schneidewin (1864)

Further reading

External links
 

1810 births
1856 deaths
People from Helmstedt
People from the Duchy of Brunswick
German classical philologists
German philologists
Academic staff of the University of Göttingen